Flagtown is an unincorporated community and census-designated place located within Hillsborough Township, in Somerset County, in the U.S. state of New Jersey.

History
The area was originally called Flagtown Station when the Lehigh Valley Railroad came through, after the nearby Flagtown, which had been corrupted from Flaggtown.  The original Flaggtown (later renamed Frankfort, when Flagtown Station became Flagtown) was named for Jacob Flagg, who purchased a tract in 1700. Some years later, J. Flagg, a descendant and proprietor of a local tavern had it used as headquarters for the Hillsborough Company in the American Revolutionary War. At election time, the tavern served as a voting place. The first school was built there about 1725 on a knoll near the future site of the railroad station and it is said that William Parrish taught there. When the building was replaced in 1795, it was painted red and white and called "The Old Red School House."

Postal service
Flagtown has its own post office (ZIP code 08821) but no house-to-house mailbox delivery, therefore residents have no other option than to have a P.O. box address. Some residents (on the main streets, not the side streets) have the option to have home delivery if they accept Hillsborough as their postal address. Prior to the Hillsborough post office's existence, Neshanic previously had covered partial Flagtown home delivery. The Flagtown post office is especially small (despite some expansion work done within the last 10 years), and usually staffed by one or two workers at any given time, who take care of all jobs themselves. It can be uncomfortably crowded in the p.o. box foyer/window area if a mere 4-5 customers are in line, or retrieving mail from their boxes. There's very limited parking, as the post office is part of an apartment/storefront, sharing the building with a small local deli and two residential apartments. A gas station/car repair shop, a separate building, shares the parking lot.

During the 4th of July and Flag Day, the Flagtown post office has an inordinate amount of extra mail than normal because there is no "Flagtown" in any other states, therefore people come from afar to drop off their outgoing postcards and letters to be hand-canceled by Flagtown on days relating to the flag, making the cancellation name and date a unique souvenir.

Fire Department
Despite the small size of Flagtown, they have their own volunteer fire department, the Hillsborough Volunteer Fire Co. No. 1. They have been known for years for having green fire trucks rather than the typical red, often referred to as "Mean and Green." They were originally pine green, but the more modern trucks are a fluorescent lime green, almost yellow, making them instantly stand out and recognizable.

The Flagtown Fire Department was the first fire company formed in the township of Hillsborough, the largest township in the county of Somerset, state of New Jersey. In 1937, seven members of the Township Board of Trade decided that Hillsborough needed its own fire company, and on May 27, 1938, the Hillsborough Volunteer Fire Company No. 1 received its charter. They purchased its first fire truck that same year, a used chemical engine; nine years later they bought a surplus army fire truck. The trucks had originally been housed in a garage at the Clawson Machine Shop for eight years, but in 1946 they built a firehouse for the trucks. Lumber for the building was donated by Doris Duke, the tobacco heiress (who lived in the area), and the building has been added to and restructured over the years to house more trucks and meet the needs of the department.

It's been a tradition for many years for Santa to ride around Flagtown atop one of the fire trucks near Christmas time, "Ho ho ho-ing" over the PA system and making personal pit-stops to kids on the block, distributing toys and candy.

Notable people

People who were born in, residents of, or otherwise closely associated with Flagtown include:
Sylvia Dubois (1788/89–1888), an enslaved, then free, woman
Emanuel Ninger (1846/47–1924), counterfeiter in the late 1880s

References

External links
Flagtown Fire Department

Hillsborough Township, New Jersey
Census-designated places in Somerset County, New Jersey
Census-designated places in New Jersey
Unincorporated communities in Somerset County, New Jersey
Unincorporated communities in New Jersey